When Helping Hurts: Alleviating Poverty Without Hurting the Poor. . . and Yourself is a 2009 non-fiction book by Steve Corbett and Brian Fikkert. The book was first published on June 24, 2009 through Moody Publishers and explores and dissects common perceptions on poverty and the means to relieve it, from a Christian perspective. In 2012, Moody published a revised, second edition. By June 2015, When Helping Hurts had sold more than 300,000 copies and been translated into 5 languages.

Synopsis
When Helping Hurts uses the Bible and the Great Commission to state that the church's mission should be to help the poor and the desolate. Corbett and Fikkert state that the definition of poverty will change depending on who is defining it, with the poor defining it through the psychological and social scope while more wealthy churches emphasize the lack of material things or a geographical location. The authors emphasize that this can cause a harmful cycle where North American churches provide material resources and evangelism to the poor, which reinforces the poor people's sense of inferiority and lack of self-esteem, which in turn increases the original problem. Corbett and Fikkert give several hypothetical scenarios to illustrate this cycle and then offer several solutions that they say can alleviate poverty. They promote the use of asset-based community development as a strategy, arguing that focusing on what resources and abilities that the community already has is often more helpful and more empowering than focusing on what the community doesn't have. This prevents paternalism where outside workers provide the "only" answer.

Structure
The book was originally divided into three parts: the mission of the church and the Christian view of poverty, discussion on poverty and examples of harmful poverty alleviation, and strategies for addressing poverty. The second edition added a fourth part that gave additional resources to bring about real change in church and community.

Christian view of poverty (according to the authors)
According to the authors, the Christian view of poverty comes from a proper understanding of why Jesus came to earth, namely, to bring healing to the entire cosmos and be supreme over all the universe. They cite a model Bryant L. Myers develops in Walking with the Poor: Principles and Practices of Transformational Development that describes humans as being in relationship with God, Self, Others, and the Rest of Creation. This comes from the concept that God originally designed humans in His image, and therefore as relational beings. This contrasts with a view that Jesus came only to save mankind from their sin so they could go to heaven. Referring to Colossians 1, they say Jesus came not only to save souls, but also to reconcile all things to God, or “to put into right relationship all that He created”. They quote Bryant Myers, "Poverty is the result of relationships that do not work, that are not just, that are not for life, that are not harmonious or enjoyable. Poverty is the absence of shalom in all its meanings." Lesa Engelthaler in Christianity Today wrote that the premise of the book is that, "in one way or the other, every human being is poor."

Shame. Fear. Unhappiness. Depression. Inferiority. Powerlessness. Dissatisfaction. Voicelessness.  No one wants these attributes in their daily lives but this is what a person in poverty feels every day. From, not only a Christian view, but from the view of any person whether they are well off or have to live from day to day, understand that no human should live in poverty whether it be in physical, emotional, or spiritual poverty. Unfortunately, when people think of the word poverty their mind immediately thinks of material things or money. “Poverty is not just a lack of money. It is not just hunger and need for shelter or clothing. Many poor people are plagued with social and spiritual poverty, and their view of their value is also affected.” For Christians, poverty alleviation stems from the Bible, first and foremost, and the key is to bring people to Jesus Christ while also providing necessary help. For many, especially in the western world, poverty is seen as a lack of material things. Lack of housing, food, water, clothes etc., but for people and organizations that base themselves in Christianity it is more than just providing the basic necessities but also, as it says in ‘When Helping Hurts’ by Steve Corbett and Brian Fikkert, “Poverty is rooted in broken relationships, so the solution to poverty is rooted in the power of Jesus’ death and resurrection to put all things into right relationship again”.

If this is the Christian view on poverty, then material things are not going to be able to provide what is really needed. Not only may this be the wrong approach but you may end up doing more harm than good. Material things are not always the answer to everything. Most westerners consciously or unconsciously believe that in order to alleviate poverty, material things must be given, or money must be given in order to obtain those material things like when you see an ad on TV asking to feed the poor in some ‘third world’ country.   Your first thought may be something like this, “If I donate, this money will be used for food, water, clothes…” Of course there’s nothing wrong with that, It’s Great!. But is that really what they need when a family has just been killed? No, they need emotional support like any other person. When your government is collapsing, you don’t need money (necessarily) you need a good person, a smart person, in a position of power to move in the right direction.

The giving of material things isn’t bad, but it isn’t always good. In the book ‘When Helping Hurts,’ poverty alleviation is described as, “....the ministry of reconciliation: moving people closer to glorifying God by living in right relationship with God, with self, with others, and with the rest of creation“. Poverty alleviation is not just the giving of material things it is about taking care of the whole human being: the social, emotional, mental, physical, and spiritual aspects of the person.  To be able to alleviate poverty properly, the right mindset is needed. Believing that money or material things can solve your problems will instead cause poverty to be elevated instead of being alleviated. A first step to alleviating poverty is changing the mindset of those who want to help and those who need help. Material things aren’t everything. This is a step that every organization, spiritually based or not, needs to take if they are to aid the poor. You must not look at just the surface but on the inside as well. Looks can be deceiving and if you don’t consider every aspect of the human being then you will be doing more harm than good. Poverty isn’t just a lack of material things but also a lack of what makes a person human. Pride. Self-esteem. Courage. Happiness. These are things that money can’t buy and that money cannot give you.

Reception
Reception for When Helping Hurts has been positive, with World Magazine's Joel Belz calling it "solid stuff". Mission Studies gave a positive review for When Helping Hurts, saying it was "based on good theological premises" and "is a very useful and accessible contribution to Christian relief and development". Charity organization Children of the Nations cited it as one of their "favorite books" and as a recommended read.

Criticism
When asked if he has regrets about the book, Fikkert said that he has found many people stop helping for fear that it is causing unintended hurt, saying some call it “When Helping Hurts paralysis”. He said this misses the point, “The point was a pause and some redirection.” In the Preface of the second edition, they address this, saying Christians should multiply their efforts, while considering their methods of helping the poor.

References

External links
 

2009 non-fiction books
American non-fiction books
Economic development
Christian literature
Moody Publishers books
Books about poverty